Lars Koch is a Danish sprint and marathon canoeist who competed in the mid to late 1980s. He won two medals at the ICF Canoe Sprint World Championships with a silver (K-2 10000 m: 1987) and a bronze (K-4 10000 m: 1985).

References

Danish male canoeists
Year of birth missing (living people)
Living people
ICF Canoe Sprint World Championships medalists in kayak
Medalists at the ICF Canoe Marathon World Championships